The Portrait of Prince Philip Prospero is a 1659 portrait of Philip Prospero, Prince of Asturias by Diego Velázquez. It is now in the Kunsthistorisches Museum in Vienna.

External links
Velázquez , exhibition catalog from The Metropolitan Museum of Art (fully available online as PDF), which contains material on this portrait (see index)

Philip Prospero
1659 paintings
Philip Prospero
1650s in Spain
Philip Prospero
Paintings of children
Dogs in art